Guru is a 2007 Indian Hindi-language  drama film directed and co-written by Mani Ratnam. It stars Mithun Chakraborty, Abhishek Bachchan, Aishwarya Rai Bachchan, Madhavan, Vidya Balan and Roshan Seth. The score and soundtrack for the film was composed by A. R. Rahman. Incidentally, Mithun Chakraborty also previously acted in a 1989 film of the same name in Hindi, as well as a 2003 film of the same name in Bengali.

The film was rumored to be a biopic of the industrial tycoon Dhirubhai Ambani, but Ratnam refuted the claims, clarifying it was a work of fiction. The film was released on 12 January 2007 with its première at the Elgin Theatre in Toronto, Canada, on Thursday, 11 January 2007 by Roger Nair, making it the first Indian film to have a mainstream international première in Canada. Roger Nair productions acquired the rights for Canada and held a premiere with most of the cast and crew flown to Toronto, Canada. The film was premiered in the Tous Les Cinemas du Monde (World Cinema) section of 2007 Cannes Film Festival. The film had also been dubbed and released in Tamil with the same title while in Telugu with the title Gurukanth.

Plot 
The beginning of the film is set in 1951 in a small village of Idar in Sabarkantha district, northern Gujarat, where a young man named Gurukant Desai dreams of making it big someday. His father Kantilal, the headmaster of the village school, tells him not to dream and that dreams never come true. Guru decides to go to Turkey and enter the spice trade, followed by a blue-collar job with Burmah Shell; later, he is promoted but refuses the job, as he wants to work for himself. Guru returns to his village, he marries Sujata, mainly because of the dowry she brings him. Along with Sujata and her brother Jignesh, Guru migrates to Bombay and starts trading in cloth. Gradually, he expands his business and sets up manufacturing units of his own, under the name "Shakti Corporation".

"Nanaji" Manik Dasgupta, who publishes a newspaper "Swatantra" ("The Independent"), treats Guru as his son. Guru likewise looks upon him as a father figure who supported him during his early days of struggle in Bombay. He also develops a strong friendship with Meenu, granddaughter of Nanaji. Meenu develops multiple sclerosis as she grows up, and begins using a wheelchair.

As Guru's business grows into one of the largest in India, he ruthlessly pursues success. He smuggles machine parts for his polyester mills, illegally creates goods, and manipulates stocks to make a higher profit. But when Nanaji learns that Guru's means of success are not always honest, he, along with a reporter of his newspaper, Shyam Saxena, decides to expose Guru's increasingly corrupt ways.

The stress of his battle with the newspaper causes Guru to have a stroke, and he is paralysed on his right side. Meanwhile, Meenu, who is now married to Shyam, is slowly weakening from her illness, and eventually dies. In the end, Guru is brought before a private government inquiry on 16 October 1980 to defend himself against the charges pressed against him, but tells the press in next day that he was an ordinary villager who didn't even understand the meaning of excise duty, customs, sales tax. All he knew was his business. But the corrupt system made sure that a villager doesn't become a rich businessman. As a result, he had to indulge in corrupt practices. This forces the government to clear him of 27 of the 29 charges against him. He is charged with a fine of ₹6.3 million (equivalent to ₹100 million or US$1.6 million in 2016) and ₹96,000 (equivalent to ₹1.6 million or US$24,000 in 2016) for the respective two charges, which are proved and is allowed to return to his company. The movie ends with Guru telling Shakti's shareholders that his father was proven wrong as he said dreams don't turn true, but they all are now a part of India's largest company. Guru asks them if they should stop. Shareholders refuse and resolve to be the largest company in the world instead.

Cast

 Abhishek Bachchan as Gurukant "Guru" Desai
 Aishwarya Rai Bachchan as Sujata "Suju" Desai
 Mithun Chakraborty as "Nanaji" Manik Dasgupta
 Madhavan as Shyam Saxena
 Vidya Balan as Meenakshi "Meenu" Saxena (née Gupta)
 Roshan Seth as Justice Thapar
 Mallika Sherawat in a guest appearance as Champa, the dancer in song "Mayya Mayya"
 Aarya Babbar as Jignesh
 Arjan Bajwa as Arzan Contractor
 Rajendra Gupta as Guru's father Kantilal Desai
 Sarita Joshi as Guru's stepmother
 Sachin Khedekar as Sujata's father
 Sudhir Pandey as Mathura Das
 Neena Kulkarni as Tulsiben, Sujata's mother
 Prathap K. Pothan as K. R. Menon I.A.S.
 Darshan Jariwala as cashier Anand Palekar
 Sanjay Mishra as Chhagan, Guru's senior in Turkey
 Manoj Joshi as Ghanshyam Das
 Dhritiman Chatterjee as Contractor
 Sanjay Swaraj as Guru's brother
 T. M. Karthik as Doctor
 Ashoi as Disha Desai and Drishti Desai, Guru's twin daughters
 Anaushka Danthra as Young Meenakshi Gupta
 Sunil Agarwal as Ashok Agarwal
 Murad Ali
 Raviprakash as Bhanu Patel (in voice)
 Sunny Subramanian as Young Guru
 Mukesh S Bhatt as Ramlal

Production
Guru was written and directed by Mani Ratnam, while Vijay Krishna Acharya wrote the Hindi dialogues. Filming took place in Mumbai, Turkey, Badami and Melkote (both in Karnataka), as well as in Chennai, Pollachi, Chettinad region Tamil Nadu, and Athirappilly in Kerala. Much of the film was shot on the Express Estates, the former home of The Indian Express and Dinamani. The music is composed by A. R. Rahman, with lyrics by Gulzar. Cinematography for the film is handled by Rajiv Menon. Several scenes were deleted from the final theatrical version, including a scene in which Sujata first gives birth to a stillborn child and a scene in which Guru becomes angry with his wife for visiting Manik Dasgupta.

Guru has others involved in the production as a film that is reflective of a man's desire for ambition and success, and how times have changed from the period immediately after the country's independence to the present. Some reports have speculated that this film is a biographical film of, one of India's biggest industrial tycoons, Dhirubhai Ambani. Like Guru, Ambani also had roots in Gujarat as the son of a schoolteacher, went abroad to work for the gas company Shell, and returned to India to import polyester. Ratnam has described Guru as inspired by stories both past and present.

The less known fact is that, the role of Madhavan is based on Swaminathan Gurumurthy, who along with Ramnath Goenka worked to expose Reliance Industries. The title is speculated to be an acknowledgement of this fact, where in his name is playfully swapped with Ambani's character. In real life, Gurumurthy has twin daughters much like the Guru character in the movie.

Reception

Box office
Guru opened well upon release, gaining momentum over time. In the United States, Guru, opening on a limited release, registered good collections in its opening weekend, fetching  during this period, with a high screen average. By its seventh week, the film had netted  in India, collecting  in the US and the UK. In the United States, it was a blockbuster.

Critical reception
Guru has received positive reviews from critics. Abhishek Bachchan received widespread praise for his performance. The film has a rating of 83% at the review website Rotten Tomatoes.  The New York Times said of the film "You might think it would be difficult to fashion an entertaining account of the life of a polyester manufacturer, even a fictitious one. But director Mani Ratnam has done so with Guru, an epic paean to can-do spirit and Mumbai capitalism."  The New York Post gave it three out of four stars, and the Los Angeles Weekly called it the best Hindi film since Lagaan (2001). Richard Corliss of Time compared the film to Frank Capra's It's a Wonderful Life and said that one of the main highlights of the film was its climax. This Guru is more like a fine polyester. He further noted, "Ash's film eminence remains a mystery. No question she's pretty, but she's more an actress-model than a model-actress. In Guru, she's mainly ornamentation". The Hindustan Times reviewer gave it a three and half stars and noted " Ratnam and Bachchan Jr have given you a film that’s as close to life as say, business is to politics. For the discerning viewer, satisfaction is guaranteed.. and some more. Rai is marvellous, handling complex scenes with grace and empathy. Above all, the enterprise belongs to Bachchan. He is astonishingly nuanced and unwaveringly forceful in his career-best performance after Yuva (2004)." Critic Taran Adarsh from Bollywood Hungama gave a four star rating and claimed in his review that "Guru ranks as one of Mani Ratnam's finest efforts and one of the best to come out of Hindi cinema," and praised actors performances writing "Reserve all the awards for Bachchan. No two opinions on that! His performance in Guru is world class and without doubt. From a sharp teenager in Turkey to the biggest entrepreneur of the country, Bachchan handles the various shades his character demands with adroitness."

Raja Sen from Rediff gave a three stars said that "Guru is fuelled by a slew of strong performances. Bachchan owns the movie, forcing audiences to sit up straight as it begins and making us laugh and applaud as he carries on. He's impressive in every frame, as he ebulliently takes over an alien room by hopping onto a chair, or when he's trying to be ever so slightly slimy, polishing his spectacles and showing off his smarminess". Daily News and Analysis reviewer gave a three star rating and cited "Guru is a film that enthralls you for most of its running time as it traces the life of the uncannily forward seeing bumpkin from Gujarat who turns every disadvantage into an advantage. With Guru, Bachchan has finally learnt the nuances of the grammar of cinema, in what will very likely be his defining film". Sify gave its verdict as "Very Good" and stated "Mani Ratnam’s Guru is undoubtedly a gutsy and outstanding film. Outstanding performance is extracted from everyone in the cast." The Hindu cited that "Guru is vintage Mani Ratnam. It encapsulates his characteristic canniness about human nature, specifically relationships. This is considered Abhishek Bachchan's role of a lifetime." Rajeev Masand of CNN-IBN gave four stars explaining "The beauty of Mani Ratnam's cinema is truly in its unpredictability. Few filmmakers can translate their personal vision onto screen the way Mani Ratnam can. So that's two thumbs up for Guru – it's a must-watch for all. Of the film's cast, Chakraborty playing the ruthless newspaper baron, deserves mention for the dignity which he brings to the part, one that's clearly inspired by Indian Express founder Ramnath Goenka. The actor in this film who truly blew my mind, is Rai. There is a silent grace, quiet nobility to her performance, which I have to admit I've never seen before. Of course, the film belongs to Bachchan, the protagonist, Guru himself. And in all honesty, Bachchan rises to the challenge like never before." The Sunday Times stated "It is certainly one of the best Bollywood movies you will see. Performances attract admiration: Bachchan does a De Niro, piling on the dosas to show the ageing and overweight Guru and he is, surprisingly, impressive. Rai sheds her usual doe-eyed expressions and is endearing as the supportive but fiery wife, who looks and dances like an angel. Chakraborty and Tamil superstar Madhavan shine equally brightly in underwritten supporting roles". BBC reviewer Jaspreet Pandohar gave it a three star rating and noted "Ratnam's absorbing screenplay ensures that Guru rises above the usual rags to riches story, by weaving in meaty subplots involving the protagonist's complex relationships with his loyal wife (Rai), friends and foes".

Accolades

Soundtrack

The soundtrack for this film is composed by A. R. Rahman. For his work in this film, A. R. Rahman received awards for Best Music Director and Best Background Score at the 53rd Filmfare Awards as well as the 9th IIFA awards. According to the Indian trade website Box Office India, with around 11,50,000 units sold, this film's soundtrack album was the year's twelfth highest-selling.

See also 
 List of Bollywood films of 2007

References

External links
 
 

2007 films
Films shot in Kerala
Films set in the 1950s
Films set in the 1960s
Films set in the 1970s
Films set in the 1980s
2000s Hindi-language films
Films directed by Mani Ratnam
Indian drama films
2000s business films
Films shot in Madurai
Films shot in Turkey
Films shot in Mumbai
Films scored by A. R. Rahman
Films shot in Chalakudy
2007 drama films
Films shot in Thrissur